Osmo Uolevi Lindeman (16 May 1929 – 15 February 1987) was a Finnish composer and music pedagogue.

Lindeman worked as a jazz and dance musician, with piano being his instrument. He became known as a pioneer of Finnish electronic music. Lindeman also composed music for several films, such as Matti Kassila's Punainen viiva (1961) for which he received a Jussi Award.  Another Kassila film, Kaasua, komisario Palmu!, brought him his second Jussi Award in 1961.

Selected filmography 

Punainen viiva (1959)
Komisario Palmun erehdys (1960)
Tulipunainen kyyhkynen (1961)
Rakas... (1961)
Kultainen vasikka (1961)
Kaasua, komisario Palmu! (1961)
Tähdet kertovat, komisario Palmu (1962)
Totuus on armoton (1963)

References

External links 
 

1929 births
1987 deaths
Finnish male composers
Finnish film score composers
Male film score composers
20th-century male musicians
20th-century Finnish composers